The USA Rugby Elite Cup was an American rugby union competition which ran for just one season in 2013. The competition was founded in 2012, replacing the USA Rugby Super League involving top USA rugby clubs. The inaugural Elite Cup tournament began on 16 March 2013, but the competition folded at the end of 2013.

Format

Pool stage

Two pools of four teams play three games, one against each other team in their pool. There is no inter-pool play. The pools are divided geographically, East & West. Four points are awarded for a win and two points for a draw. A bonus point is awarded for a loss by seven points or fewer, or for scoring four tries or more. The top two teams from each pool qualify for the semi-finals. The two pool winners have home field advantage.

Knock-out stage

The semi-finals are East 1 vs East 2 and West 1 vs West 2.  The semi-finals are played at the home stadiums of the higher-seeded teams.

Teams

Results

References

2013 in American rugby union
Defunct rugby union competitions in the United States
Rugby Super League (United States)